Eugene Leslie Ahern (September 16, 1895 – March 6, 1960) was a cartoonist best known for his bombastic Major Hoople, a pompous character who appeared in the long-run syndicated gag panel Our Boarding House. Many of Ahern's comic strips took a surreal or screwball approach, notably The Squirrel Cage with its nonsensical catchphrase "Nov shmoz ka pop?"

Early life 
Ahern was born and raised in Chicago, attending public schools and working as a butcher boy, as noted in a 1929 newspaper article:

In his teens, he worked as a model, which he later recalled, "Daily, I slipped on cutaway coats, silk top hats and immaculate white gloves—and stood indolently in the front of a room while an artist sketched me for a catalogue."

Comic strip career

In 1914, after three years study at the Chicago Art Institute, Ahern went to Cleveland and worked for the Newspaper Enterprise Association (NEA) syndicate as a sportswriter and artist, initially inking comic drawings for $18 a week.<ref name=puf>[https://web.archive.org/web/20081215082555/http://www.time.com/time/magazine/article/0,9171,756049,00.html "Hoople v. Puffle, Time, May 11, 1936.]</ref> He worked on such strips as Dream Dope, Fathead Fritz, Sporty Sid and his Pals, Taking Her to the Ball Game, Ain't Nature Wonderful, Squirrel Food, Balmy Benny and Otto Auto, about a man who loved driving so much that he couldn't stop. Comic strip historian Allan Holtz described the transitions of these Ahern creations:

The Nut Brothers
In 1921 he introduced the Nut Brothers, Ches and Wal, in Crazy Quilt. That same year, NEA General Manager Frank Rostock suggested to Ahern that he use a boarding house for a setting. Our Boarding House began September 16, 1921, scoring a huge success with readers after the January 1922 arrival of the fustian Major Hoople. The Nut Bros: Ches and Wal ran as a topper strip above Our Boarding House.

From Hoople to Puffle
Ahern was making an annual $35,000 at NEA, and King Features Syndicate offered to double that figure. Leaving NEA in March 1936 for King Features, Ahern created Room and Board (1936–1953). A resident in that boarding house was Judge Puffle, very much in the Hoople tradition.

Don Markstein traced the proliferation of Puffle and other Hoople variations:

RadioOur Boarding House was adapted into the radio series Major Hoople (1942–43). No copies of this radio series are known to exist.

 Personal life 
Living in California for 36 years, Ahern resided at 1280 Stone Canyon in Los Angeles during the 1940s. He was a member of the Los Angeles Art Association, the Bel-Air Country Club, the Los Angeles Philharmonic Association and the National Cartoonists Society.

When he died of a heart attack in 1960, he was survived by his wife, Jane; a daughter, Mrs. Nancy Hayward of Clemmons, North Carolina; a sister, Mrs. Donald McCurdy; and three brothers, Walter, Harold and John, all of Chicago.

Influence
Ahern's The Squirrel Cage (1936–53) featured a bearded character known as The Little Hitchhiker, who became notorious for his frequent expression, "Nov shmoz ka pop?", which he uttered while thumbing for a ride.  Some sources say that the phrase is Russian for "Going my way?",  others say that the phrase is complete nonsense.  The character was the acknowledged inspiration for Robert Crumb's Mr. Natural. The Squirrel Cage was collected into a book by publisher Ken Pierce. It was popular enough that it was used as nose art on at least two US bomber aircraft during the Second World War, a B-17G with 487th Bomb Group and a B-24 that served with the 466th, 93rd, and 446th Bomber Groups.

References

External links
 Gene Ahern at the Lambiek Comiclopedia
 Billy Ireland Cartoon Library & Museum Art Database
 June 1997 interview with Frank Bresee who discusses his role on Major Hoople

Further reading
 Strickler, Dave. Syndicated Comic Strips and Artists, 1924-1995: The Complete Index.'' Cambria, California: Comics Access, 1995. 

1895 births
1960 deaths
American comics artists
American comic strip cartoonists